Der (Sumerian: ALUDi-e-ir , 𒌷𒂦𒀭𒆠 uruBAD3.ANki) was a Sumerian city-state at the site of modern Tell Aqar near al-Badra in Iraq's Wasit Governorate. It was east of the Tigris River on the border between Sumer and Elam. Its name was possibly Durum.

History
Der was occupied from the Early Dynastic period through Neo-Assyrian times. The local deity of the city was named Ishtaran, represented on Earth by his minister, the snake god Nirah. In the late 3rd millennium, during the reign of Sulgi of the Third Dynasty of Ur, Der was mentioned twice. The Sulgi year name 11 was named "Year Ishtaran of Der was brought into his temple", and year 21 was named "Year Der was destroyed". During the time of Amar-Sin, when the king launched a long military campaign against Huhnuri, prince Shu-Sin, crown prince, left his post in Der to return and hold Ur. In the second millennium, Der was mentioned in a tablet discovered at Mari sent by Yarim-Lim I of Yamhad; the tablet includes a reminder to Yasub-Yahad king of Der about the military help given to him for fifteen years by Yarim-Lim, followed by a declaration of war against the city in retaliation for what Yarim-Lim described as evil deeds committed by Yasub-Yahad.

Rim-Sin I of Larsa reported destroying Der in his 20th year. Ammi-Ditana of Babylon also recorded destroying the city wall of Der in his 37th year, that he said had been built earlier by Damqi-ilishu of the Sealand Dynasty. In 720 BC the Assyrian king Sargon II moved against Elam, but the Assyrian host was defeated near Der by the combined army of king Humban-Nikash I of Elam and king Marduk-apla-iddina II of Babylon. Following the Persian conquest of Babylon in 539 BC, the Cyrus Cylinder mentions repatriating the people and restoring the sanctuary of the god of Der, among other cities.

Archaeology
While it appears that no excavation has occurred at Der, several notable objects have been discovered nearby, including a kudurru (discovered in Sippar) which confirmed the name of the site. The site itself has been heavily damaged by water over the centuries and was considered not worth excavating.

See also
 List of cities of the ancient Near East
 Tell

Notes

Further reading
P. Michalowski, Durum and Uruk during the Ur III Period, Mesopotamia, vol.  12, pp. 83 –96, 1977

External links
 Stela at British Museum mentioning Der

Sumerian cities
Archaeological sites in Iraq
Former populated places in Iraq
Wasit Governorate
City-states
Former kingdoms